Rose of Tralee is a 1937 British musical film directed by Oswald Mitchell and starring Binkie Stuart, Kathleen O'Regan and Fred Conyngham. The screenplay concerns an Irish singer who goes to New York City to make his fortune, but loses contact with his wife and family.

Cast
 Binkie Stuart - Rose O'Malley 
 Kathleen O'Regan - Mary O'Malley 
 Fred Conyngham - Paddy O'Malley 
 Danny Malone - Singer 
 Dorothy Dare - Jean Hale 
 Sydney Fairbrother - Mrs. Thompson 
 Talbot O'Farrell - Tim Kelly 
 C. Denier Warren - Henry Collett 
 Patrick Ludlow - Frank 
 Scott Harold - Gleeson

See also
"The Rose of Tralee (song)"
Rose of Tralee (1942 film)

References

External links

1937 films
1937 musical films
British musical films
Films directed by Oswald Mitchell
British black-and-white films
1930s English-language films
1930s British films